Plush is a small village in the English county of Dorset.

Plush consists of a few thatched cottages, a public house, a Regency manor house and a small church dedicated to St John the Baptist; the church was designed in 1848 by Benjamin Ferrey, a Gothic Revival architect and close friend of Pugin.

See also
 Music at Plush

References

Villages in Dorset